Kabok or Kapok is a Meitei Manipuri ethnic food item, generally made up of puffed rice, roasted rice and molasses. It is available in many flavours, including honey flavor, sugarcane flavor and many others. It is a very popular snack in the Indian state of Manipur, especially among the Manipuri ethnicity. Tronglaobi village is the largest Kabok producing village in Manipur

See Also 

 Rice pudding
 gruel

References 

Meitei culture
Pages with unreviewed translations